Juan Casamajo (born 25 October 1945) is a Spanish sports shooter. He competed in the mixed 50 metre rifle prone event at the 1980 Summer Olympics.

References

1945 births
Living people
Spanish male sport shooters
Olympic shooters of Spain
Shooters at the 1980 Summer Olympics
Place of birth missing (living people)
20th-century Spanish people